The following lists events that happened during 2009 in Chile.

Incumbents
 President: Michelle Bachelet (Socialist)

Events

December
December 11 – In  Cerro Paranal, the  VISTA survey telescope   begins work at the Paranal Observatory.

References

 
Years of the 21st century in Chile
2000s in Chile
Chile
Chile